John C. Doesburg is a retired general for the United States Army.

He was the commanding general for the Army Soldier Biological and Chemical Command.

Biography 
He was born on March 15, 1947, in Milwaukee to an Army family.

During his childhood he lived in places like Pennsylvania, Texas, Germany, Oklahoma and Arkansas.

In 1970, he graduated from the University of Oklahoma with a degree in chemistry. The same year he joined the United States Army through Reserve Officers' Training Corps.

In 2010, he became the Honorary Colonel of the Regiment.

References 

United States Army generals
University of Oklahoma alumni
1947 births
Living people